

CopperCube is a game engine with graphical editor developed by Ambiera. It is aimed primarily at non-programmers, for creating 3D applications in a drag-and-drop format based on a behavior and action-oriented logic system. Additional actions and behaviors can be created in JavaScript.

The editor runs on Windows and no longer runs on the newer versions of macOS and creates games and interactive 3D simulations as applications for Windows, and Android and as website embedded programs using WebGL.

See also

 3D computer graphics software
 Game engines

References

External links
 

Video game development software
Video game engines